Elżbieta Porzec (27 January 1945 – 7 June 2019) was a Polish volleyball player, a member of Poland women's national volleyball team in 1963–1976, a bronze medalist of the Olympic Games Mexico 1968.

References

1945 births
2019 deaths
Volleyball players at the 1968 Summer Olympics
Polish women's volleyball players
Olympic medalists in volleyball
Olympic volleyball players of Poland
Sportspeople from Lublin
Medalists at the 1968 Summer Olympics
Olympic bronze medalists for Poland